Heiligenberg is a municipality and a village in the Bodensee district, Baden-Württemberg, Germany.

Heiligenberg may also refer to:

Places

Austria
 Heiligenberg, Austria in Upper Austria

Czech Republic
Svatý Kopeček (German: Heiligenberg), a part of Olomouc

France
 Heiligenberg, Bas-Rhin, Alsace

Germany
 Heiligenberg bei Naumburg, part of the city of Naumburg, Hesse
 Heiligenberg bei Schönau, village in the district of Schönau in Rottal-Inn, Bavaria
 Heiligenberg bei Bruchhausen-Vilsen, village in the district of Bruchhausen-Vilsen in Diepholz, Lower Saxony
 Heiligenberg bei Hochspeyer, village in the district of Hochspeyer in Kaiserslautern, Rhineland-Palatinate

Geographic areas
 Heiligenberg (Heidelberg), a mountain in the Odenwald near Heidelberg
 Heiligenberg (Naumburg), a mountain in the Kassel district of Hesse
 Heiligenberg, a mountain in Seeheim-Jugenheim in Darmstadt-Dieburg, Hesse
 Heiligenberg, a hill near Felsberg in Schwalm-Eder-Kreis, Hesse, see Heiligenburg Castle 
 Heiligenberg, a mountain in Hochspeyer in Kaiserslautern, Rhineland-Palatinate

Castles and palaces
 Schloss Heiligenberg, Hesse near Seeheim-Jugenheim in Darmstadt-Dieburg, Hesse
 Heiligenburg Castle or Heiligenberg Castle, a castle ruin on Heiligenberg near Felsberg in Schwalm-Eder-Kreis, Hesse
 Schloss Heiligenberg, Baden-Württemberg in Heiligenberg, Baden-Württemberg
 Heiligenberg (Leusden), an estate and former monastery in the Netherlands

People
 Walter Heiligenberg (1938–1994), German biologist